Remedial and Special Education is a peer-reviewed academic journal that covers research in the field of special education. The editors-in-chief are Kathleen Lane and Karrie Shogren (University of Kansas). It was established in 1984 and is currently published by SAGE Publications in association with the Hammill Institute on Disabilities.

Abstracting and indexing 
Remedial and Special Education is abstracted and indexed in, among other databases, Scopus and the Social Sciences Citation Index. According to the Journal Citation Reports, its 2021 impact factor is 5.258, ranking it 1st out of 44 journals in the category "Education, Special".

References

External links 
 
 Hammill Institute  on Disabilities

SAGE Publishing academic journals
English-language journals
Bimonthly journals
Publications established in 1984
Special education journals